Adam Faulkner or Falkner may refer to:

Adam Faulkner (swimmer) (born 1981), from Australia
Adam Faulkner (Saw), a character in the Saw movies

See also
Adam Falkner, American author
Adam Falkner, musician in Babyshambles and One Eskimo
Adam Faulconer, fictional character